Donald James Cameron (15 October 1917 – 22 June 1964), Australian politician, was born in Cloncurry, Queensland, and was educated at Catholic schools. He moved to Brisbane where he worked as a chef and catering manager. Active in the Australian Labor Party from an early age, he unexpectedly won the middle-class seat of Lilley at the 1961 election, but was defeated in 1963.

In May 1963, Cameron suffered a heart attack while flying from Brisbane to Sydney.

Cameron died in 1964, aged 46, and was buried in Nudgee Cemetery.

References 

1917 births
1964 deaths
Australian Labor Party members of the Parliament of Australia
Members of the Australian House of Representatives
Members of the Australian House of Representatives for Lilley
People from Cloncurry, Queensland
Burials at Nudgee Cemetery
20th-century Australian politicians